Beatriz Milhazes (born 1960) is a Brazilian artist. She is known for her work juxtaposing Brazilian cultural imagery and references to western Modernist painting.

Beatriz Milhazes is a Brazilian-born collage artist and painter known for her large-scale works and vibrant colors. She is also very active in the LGBTQ+ community. She has been called "Brazil's most successful contemporary painter." She has worked in the Jardín Botanico neighborhood of Rio de Janeiro since attending the Parque Lage art school at the edge of the Tijuca forest. Between art school and her current studio Milhazes rented a studio space with nine other artists from her class in an attempt to start a career.

The daughter of a lawyer and an art historian,  Beatriz Milhazes was born in Rio de Janeiro in 1960. She studied social communication at Faculdades Integradas Hélio Alonso (FACHA), Rio de Janeiro from 1978 to 1981 and studied at the School of Visual Arts (Escola de Artes Visuais - EAV) of Parque Lage, Rio de Janeiro from 1980 to 1982.

Milhazes has had solo and group exhibitions in a number of museums, including the Museum of Modern Art and the Musée d'Art Moderne de la Ville de Paris. From 4–21 July 2009, the Fondation Cartier pour l'art contemporain in Paris presented a major exhibition of her work.

Milhazes' paintings are in the permanent collections of the Museum of Modern Art, the Guggenheim, the Metropolitan Museum of Art, the Banco Itaú, and the Museo Nacional Centro de Arte Reina Sofía.

Her 2000 painting "Meu Limão" "sold [in 2012] for $2.1 million dollars at Sotheby's in California, making her the highest-priced living Brazilian artist at auction."

Technique 
In terms of technique, Milhazes is predominantly concerned with the principle of collage, drawing from her combined knowledge of both Latin American and European traditions. The cultural mixing of her native Brazil is something Milhazes is aware of and to some degree communicates in her paintings as well as being in ties with the Brazilian modernist movement. Milhazes many other influences come from her own fascination with the decorative arts, fashion, and geometry. Milhazes has described her own work in saying "I think of my work as geometric, yet I can't put everything into a square or a circle." Her self-developed process of art making came about during her extensive researching of printing processes in the 1980s.

A slow but steady process, time is key to everything for Milhazes. Many of her works start with the painting of plastic sheets, which are then glued to a canvas. These plastic sheets are then peeled off of the canvas like a decal leaving behind paint. Some of these plastic sheets have been reused by Milhazes for as long as ten years. Often if a particular motif or drawing is well liked by the artist it will be kept, repainted, and added to multiple compositions. She describes these pieces of plastic affectionately, stating that they are imprinted with a memory, a memory that can cause irregularities. These irregularities are happily accepted by Milhazes as something that just comes with her process. In her works, Beatriz focuses on achieving a smooth surface as opposed to visible brush strokes with thickness being an intriguing topic but far from integral to her work and its importance. In this way she can play with the various sheen and levels of contrast that her materials provide in an attempt to further transform her canvas. In her own words Milhazes likens her process to the working-class, saying "I tell my friends that I'm like a bank worker...I come to the studio five days a week and do my job. I pay attention to detail, and try not to make mistakes."

Influence 
Drawing from the optical reactions provoked by artists like Bridget Riley and Tarsila do Amaral, Milhazes believes that art is an essential way for people to aestheticize and exteriorize their thoughts and feelings. Her work often serves as an exploration of the concept of conflict. Filled with intense colors and shapes, her work serves to inspire a strong dialogue as well as “challenging eye movements over easy beauty.” Milhazes also draws her influences from many other female artists such as Sonia Delaunay, Georgia O'Keeffe, and Elizabeth Murray. She has also cited the canon of Brazilian art history as “empowering in its celebration of women artists such as herself.”

Themes 
Thematically, the work of Beatriz Milhazes has been described by one critic as "abstract, yet having something new to offer." This description is something that she believes draws people into her style, especially from a Western audience. Her work is known to contain many Brazilian folk references and can be interpreted as complex in this regard. These references, apparent in many of the vibrant colours and shapes, are often associated with the very poorest part of the population and are generally thought to be of little interest to the upper classes or intellectuals. These references have today changed in their meaning as the social elite has attached importance to them—the importance of being Brazilian and having Brazilian art. Finding the idea of a contradiction fascinating, it is another factor that influences the outcome of her art.

Her installation Gamboa II, for instance, was strongly influenced by the carnival in her native country Brazil which includes dance, costumes and parades. These elements are evident in the work with its bright colours that also embraces a feminine style to the work.

Exhibitions 
Inspired by late Brazilian landscape architect Roberto Burle Marx, artist Beatriz Milhazes created Gamboa II, an installation suspended from the ceiling at the Jewish Museum in NYC from May, 2016 to mid September, 2016.

References

Bibliography 

 Frédéric Paul, Beatriz Milhazes, Meu Bem, Rio de Janeiro: Base7 Projetos Culturais, 2013.

External links
 Beatriz Milhazes Official Website - https://beatrizmilhazes.com/
Galerie Max Hetzler Artist Page - Beatriz Milhazes 
White Cube Artist Page - Beatriz Milhazes
Art on the Underground - Peace and Love, Beatriz Milhazes - Gloucester Road tube station, London Underground
 2009 Exhibition at the Foundation Cartier in Paris. HD images on this blog : ZoomArt.fr (French)
 Durham Press

1960 births
Living people
20th-century Brazilian women artists
20th-century printmakers
20th-century Brazilian painters
21st-century Brazilian painters
21st-century Brazilian women artists
Brazilian women painters
Brazilian contemporary artists
Brazilian printmakers
Abstract artists
Artists from Rio de Janeiro (city)
Women printmakers